Orthogonius thaicus is a species of ground beetle in the subfamily Orthogoniinae. It was described by Tian & Deuve in 2003.

References

thaicus
Beetles described in 2003